Trachylepis ozorii is a species of skink, a lizard in the family Scincidae. The species is endemic to the island of Annobón in Equatorial Guinea.

Taxonomy
The species T. ozorii was originally described and named Mabuia ozorii by José Vicente Barbosa du Bocage in 1893.

Etymology
The specific name, ozorii, is in honor of Portuguese ichthyologist and naturalist Balthazar Osorio (1855-1926).

References

Further reading
Jesus, José; Harris, D. James; Brehm, António (2005). "Relationships of scincid lizards (Mabuya spp.) from the islands of the Gulf of Guinea based on mtDNA sequence data". Amphibia-Reptilia 26 (4): 467–473.
Ceríaco, Luis M. P.; Marques, Mariana P.; Bauer, Aaron M. (2016). "A review of the genus Trachylepis (Sauria: Scincidae) from the Gulf of Guinea, with descriptions of two new species in the Trachylepis maculilabris (Gray, 1845) species complex". Zootaxa 4109 (3): 284–314.

External links

ozorii
Endemic fauna of Annobón
Reptiles of Equatorial Guinea
Reptiles described in 1893
Taxa named by José Vicente Barbosa du Bocage